Suzie McConnell-Serio (born July 29, 1966) is a former American women's basketball coach and player. She was the head coach for the women's basketball team at the University of Pittsburgh from 2013 to 2018. In 2004, she was named WNBA Coach of the Year as coach of the Minnesota Lynx. She was inducted into the Women's Basketball Hall of Fame in 2008.

Career
Born in Pittsburgh, McConnell-Serio attended Seton-La Salle Catholic High School, leading the Lady Rebels to the PIAA state championship in 1984.  McConnell-Serio played college basketball at Penn State. In four seasons at PSU (1984-85 through 1987–88), she helped the Lady Lions to a 95–33 record and four consecutive NCAA Tournament appearances. In the process, she was named the school's first First-Team All-American while setting NCAA Division I records for career assists (1,307), assists in a season (355 in 1987) and season assist average (11.8 in 1987). Her assist total and assist per game average led the nation in both 1986 & 1987. She also set the record for most career points by anyone with 1000+ assists at 1,897 points. In 2011, Courtney Vandersloot of Gonzaga University passed her in number of assists in a single season with 367 in 2011, and number of career points with 1000+ assists with 2,073 points. As of the start of the 2017–18 season, she still holds the records for most career assists, most assists per game in a season (and most assists per game in a season by a sophomore and by a junior), and most career triple-doubles. She graduated from Penn State in 1988. She won the Frances Pomeroy Naismith Award in 1988. At the time, this award was given to the best women's basketball player in the country no taller than 5'6" (1.68 m); the height limit was later increased to 5'8" (1.73 m) before it was discontinued in 2013. She also ended her college career with seven career triple-doubles, which at the time was an NCAA all-divisions women's record (later equaled by Louella Tomlinson of Saint Mary's). This record has since been broken by Oregon's Sabrina Ionescu.

Before joining the Minnesota Lynx, McConnell-Serio served as head coach of the girls basketball team at Oakland Catholic High School in Pittsburgh for 13 years, from 1991 to 2003.  During that time, her teams won 3 PIAA state championships (1993, 2001, 2003), were runners-up twice (2000-2002), and won five consecutive district championships (1999-2003). On December 17, 2002, she reached a coaching milestone with her 300th win. She finished her high school coaching career after the 2002–2003 season with a 321–86 record.

McConnell-Serio also played in the WNBA. The former point guard played three seasons with the Cleveland Rockers (1998-2000). As a first-year player in 1998, she earned WNBA Newcomer of the Year and All-WNBA First Team honors after averaging 8.6 ppg and 6.4 apg (second in the league). She was a two-time winner of the Kim Perrot Sportsmanship Award (1998 and 2000) and finished her professional career with averages of 6.4 ppg and 4.6 apg in 81 contests.

In January 2003, McConnell-Serio returned to the WNBA as head coach of the Minnesota Lynx and took a team that finished 10–22 in the previous season to an 18–16 record and first-ever playoff appearance.

One year later, McConnell-Serio took a team picked to finish last in the Western Conference by a number of preseason publications and made a return trip to the playoffs and in the process was named the 2004 WNBA Coach of the Year. The '04 Lynx, who earned a franchise-best #3 seed in the WNBA Western Conference, tied franchise records for wins (18), home victories (11) and road wins (7) all set in McConnell-Serio's first season. In addition, Minnesota enjoyed a franchise record six-game winning streak.

However, the Lynx struggled in the 2005 and 2006 season, and McConnell-Serio resigned at mid-season on July 23, 2006.

Prior to her professional playing career, McConnell-Serio won two Olympic medals. She was a member of a gold medal-winning U.S. women's basketball team in the 1988 Summer Olympics, and earned a bronze medal at the 1992 Summer Olympics.

McConnell-Serio also won a gold medal at the 1991 World University Games. She won the 2004 WNBA Coach of the Year Award.  In 1999, Sports Illustrated magazine named her one of the Top 50 Athletes of the Century in Pennsylvania.

On April 13, 2007, McConnell-Serio was named the head coach at Duquesne University.

On April 12, 2013, McConnell-Serio was named the head coach at the University of Pittsburgh. She was fired on April 5, 2018.

Penn State statistics
Source

Personal life
McConnell-Serio is married to Pete Serio, and they have four children, Peter, Jordan, Mandi, and Madison, who all have played basketball.

McConnell-Serio is a member of the Women's Basketball Hall of Fame. She was inducted into it on June 14, 2008, at the Bijou Theatre in Knoxville, Tennessee.

McConnell-Serio's brother, Tom, played two seasons at Davidson College and was the head coach for Saint Francis, Pennsylvania from 1992 to 1999 and has been an assistant coach at Wake Forest, Marquette, and Dayton as well as women's assistant coach at the University of Colorado with their sister, Kathy. Before becoming the current head coach of the Indiana University of Pennsylvania women's team, he served as an assistant at Old Dominion.

McConnell-Serio's sister, Kathy, who was her teammate on the 1984 PIAA Championship team, is now her associate head coach at the University of Pittsburgh. She was previously the head coach at Tulsa (1999-05) and the University of Colorado (2006–10) before accepting a position as an assistant coach with the WNBA's Tulsa Shock. She was also an assistant coach at the University of Illinois (1996–99) and Rutgers (1994–95). Her first coaching job out of college was at the University of Pittsburgh as a recruiting coordinator during the 1991 season. She played in four NCAA Championships while at the University of Virginia.

McConnell-Serio's brother, Tim, played at Waynesburg and has served as the boys' coach at Chartiers Valley from 1992 to 2018 and has won over 80 percent of his games while earning his 400th career win in 2010.  In 2018, he moved to coach the Chartiers Valley Girls Basketball team.

McConnell-Serio's sister, Maureen, played at the University of Pittsburgh, and her nephew, T.J., (Tim's son) was on the Duquesne men's basketball team for two seasons (2011 and 2012) before transferring to Arizona. He currently plays for the Indiana Pacers.

Career statistics

Regular season

|-
| style="text-align:left;"|1998
| style="text-align:left;"|Cleveland
| 28 || 28 || 31.5 || .455 || .408 || .729 || 2.2 || 6.4 || 1.8 || 0.2 || 3.7 || 8.6
|-
| style="text-align:left;"|1999
| style="text-align:left;"|Cleveland
| 18 || 18 || 28.4 || .367 || .333 || .842 || 2.4 || 4.2 || 0.6 || 0.1 || 3.0 || 6.0
|-
| style="text-align:left;"|2000
| style="text-align:left;"|Cleveland
| 32 || 32 || 22.0 || .414 || .392 || .760 || 1.6 || 3.7 || 0.5 || 0.0 || 2.2 || 5.4
|-
| style="text-align:left;"|Career
| style="text-align:left;"|3 years, 1 team
| 78 || 78 || 26.9 || .420 || .382 || .754 || 2.0 || 4.8 || 1.0 || 0.1 || 2.9 || 6.7

Playoffs

|-
| style="text-align:left;"|1998
| style="text-align:left;"|Cleveland
| 3 || 3 || 33.0 || .500 || .429 || .667 || 2.3 || 5.0 || 2.7 || 0.3 || 3.0 || 6.3
|-
| style="text-align:left;"|2000
| style="text-align:left;"|Cleveland
| 6 || 6 || 24.5 || .311 || .250 || 1.000 || 2.3 || 4.2 || 0.8 || 0.2 || 2.7 || 6.5
|-
| style="text-align:left;"|Career
| style="text-align:left;"|2 years, 1 team
| 9 || 9 || 27.3 || .356 || .279 || .800 || 2.3 || 4.4 || 1.4 || 0.2 || 2.8 || 6.4

Head coaching record (College)

See also
 List of Pennsylvania State University Olympians
 List of NCAA Division I women's basketball career assists leaders
 List of NCAA Division I basketball career triple-doubles leaders

Notes

External links
WNBA Profile
Women's Basketball Hall of Fame

1966 births
Living people
All-American college women's basketball players
American women's basketball coaches
American women's basketball players
Basketball coaches from Pennsylvania
Basketball players at the 1988 Summer Olympics
Basketball players at the 1992 Summer Olympics
Basketball players from Pittsburgh
Cleveland Rockers players
Duquesne Dukes women's basketball coaches
High school basketball coaches in the United States
Medalists at the 1988 Summer Olympics
Medalists at the 1992 Summer Olympics
Minnesota Lynx head coaches
Olympic bronze medalists for the United States in basketball
Olympic gold medalists for the United States in basketball
Parade High School All-Americans (girls' basketball)
Penn State Lady Lions basketball players
Pittsburgh Panthers women's basketball coaches
Point guards
Sportspeople from Pittsburgh
Universiade gold medalists for the United States
Universiade medalists in basketball
Medalists at the 1991 Summer Universiade
United States women's national basketball team players